SM City Clark is a shopping mall owned and operated by SM Prime Holdings, Inc. It is located along M.A. Roxas Avenue in Clark Freeport, Angeles City, Philippines.  It is the second SM supermall in the province of Pampanga after SM City Pampanga in City of San Fernando and Mexico, Pampanga.

Location
SM City Clark is located along M.A. Roxas Avenue in Barangay Malabanias, Clark Freeport Zone, Angeles City, Philippines. The mall is adjacent to the Clark Main Gate, Clark Veterans Cemetery and the Clark Global City.

Facilities

Opened on May 12, 2006, the mall has a land area of 17-hectares and a total gross floor area of an estimated 144,484 square meters. It features more than 300 shops and various dining establishments. It was expanded in 2013 with a new foodcourt, The Meeting Place and a business process outsourcing (BPO) center. It also features IMAX theater which was opened on December 14, 2012. It is the sixth IMAX cinema in the country and the only IMAX cinema in Luzon outside of Metro Manila and a bowling center.

Park Inn by Radisson Blu is an 8-storey, 154-room hotel located within the mall complex. The newly constructed south wing gives an additional 95 rooms and 5 more suites. 

SMX Convention Center Clark is set to open in 2022 together with the Additional 4 BPO buildings and the skyline which will connect and provide easy access on all the buildings inside the mall complex. 

The mall complex will host the SM Grand Terminal Clark, an multimodal transport terminal. The groundbreaking for the facility took place in late 2021.

Events
The mall held the PyroFest, the biggest fireworks festival every year of November at 'The Meeting Place'.
The mall held the 10th Philippine International Pyromusical Competition on February to March 2019. This was supposed to be at the SM Mall of Asia bayside area, but was postponed in support for the Manila Bay Rehabilitation Program by the Department of Environment and Natural Resources or DENR.

Incidents

December 2015 shooting incident
On December 24, 2015, an off-duty rookie cop, suspected of trying to steal a parked motorcycle, was shot by responding Clark Development Corporation (CDC) security personnel and security guards at the mall's parking lot. The slain suspect was identified by Chief Supt. Rudy Lacadin, Police Regional Office 3 (PRO3) director as Police Officer 1 Jomar Binuya Batul, a member of the Provincial Public Safety Command in Oriental Mindoro. He allegedly tried to steal a motorcycle parked in front of a Jollibee branch, at around 3:40 in the afternoon. He fled on foot towards the mall's parking lot when a CDC security officer accosted him. A brief chase and a shootout ensued.

References

External links

SM Department Stores, official website
SM Prime Holdings, the official website of the parent company
SM Supermarket, the official website of SM Supermarket

Shopping malls in Pampanga
Shopping malls established in 2006
SM Prime
Buildings and structures in Angeles City